Azizur Rahman Chowdhury (1946-2011) is a Bangladesh Jamaat-e-Islami politician and the former Member of Parliament of Dinajpur-6.

Career
Chowdhury was elected to parliament from Dinajpur-6 as a Bangladesh Jamaat-e-Islami candidate in 1991 and 2001.

Death
Maulana Aziz passed away on 30 May 2011. His workplace was buried at the Bijul-Darul-Huda-Kamil-Post-Madrasa premises after the funeral of the family burial ground of Prof. Parapara at Birampur.

References

1946 births
2011 deaths
People from Dinajpur District, Bangladesh
Bangladesh Jamaat-e-Islami politicians
5th Jatiya Sangsad members
8th Jatiya Sangsad members